IHI can refer to:
 Ifakara Health Institute, a health research organization in Tanzania
 Information Holdings Inc., part of The Thomson Corporation since 2004
 Institute for Healthcare Improvement
 IHI Corporation, formerly known as Ishikawajima-Harima Heavy Industries, a Japanese company which produces ships, aero-engines, and other machinery
 Ice Hockey Iceland, ÍHÍ (Icelandic: Íshokkísamband Íslands)

See also
 Ihi (Bel marriage), Newar girls' mock-marriage to the bel fruit in Nepal